Lostmans River is a river located in Everglades National Park, Monroe County, Florida. It flows into the Gulf of Mexico. It is a part of the Ten Thousand Islands chain.

References

Rivers of Monroe County, Florida